Kokić is a Serbo-Croatian surname. Notable people with the surname include:

Ana Kokić (born 1983), Serbian singer-songwriter
Emilija Kokić (born 1968), Croatian singer

See also
Jokić

Croatian surnames
Serbian surnames